Loftleiðir Icelandic Airlines Flight 001, a charter flight, was a Douglas DC-8 that crashed on 15 November 1978, on approach to the international airport in Colombo, Sri Lanka. The crash killed 8 of the 13 Icelandic crew members, 5 reserve crew members, and 170 (mostly Indonesian) Muslim pilgrims from South Borneo out of a total of 262 passengers and crew. The official report by Sri Lankan authorities determined the probable cause of the crash to be failure of the crew to conform to approach procedures; however, American and Icelandic authorities claimed faulty equipment at the airport and air traffic control error as the reasons for the crash.

With 183 fatalities, the crash of Flight LL001 is the deadliest crash involving an Icelandic airline, and the second deadliest in Sri Lankan aviation history after Martinair Flight 138, another chartered DC-8, which crashed four years earlier.

Aircraft
The aircraft involved in the incident was a DC-8 chartered from the Icelandic airline Loftleiðir for Hajj operations; the aircraft's registration number was TF-FLA, and its name was "Leifur Eiríksson".

Accident 
The aircraft was chartered by Garuda Indonesia. On 15 November it operated as flight LL001 from Jeddah, Saudi Arabia, to Surabaya, Indonesia. All 13 crew members were Icelandic. There were 249 passengers, the majority being residents of Indonesia who had made the hajj to Mecca and were returning home.

The flight departed Jeddah for Surabaya with a planned stop at Bandaranaike International Airport in Colombo, Sri Lanka, for refueling and crew rotation. Thunderstorms were in the area, and windshear was an issue. At 22:53:24 local time, the control center informed the aircraft's crew that they would be landing on runway 04. In response, the crew requested a landing on runway 22. The controller approved the request and gave instructions for an ILS landing on runway 22.

The dispatcher also gave the crew instructions to report when they had reached the radio beacon, which the crew acknowledged receiving but did not confirm. The radar controller periodically transmitted distance and altitude data to the aircraft. The last radio message from the controller was given at 23:27:26: "Lima, Lima 001, slightly to the left of centre line, very slightly to the left of centre line,  from touch-down, height , cleared to land off this approach." At 23:27:37, the crew replied, "Roger."

When the approach controller subsequently acquired a visual on Flight 001, the aircraft was descending dangerously towards the ground. The controller warned the flight: "Lima, Lima 001, you are undershooting." However, the crew was then speaking with the radar controller on another frequency, and so did not receive the advisory. The approach controller then lost sight of the DC-8, after which he saw an explosion. At 23:28:03, the DC-8 crashed into a rubber and coconut plantation and exploded. The left wing tip struck the coconut trees first breaking it apart, the aircraft then banked 40 degrees to port and impacted the ground virtually disintegrating the forward fuselage, the remaining fuselage cart-wheeled out of control and split up into 6 pieces coming to a stop  past the initial point of impact. As the first witness to the crash, the approach controller immediately informed his colleagues of the incident.

Within half an hour, 5 fire trucks arrived at the crash site. The rescue operation was hampered by the presence of many coconut palm trees, which prevented access to many large pieces of equipment. One of the rescue team members was the acting head of Sri Lanka's civil aviation authority. While assisting in the rescue, he managed to document the instrument readings and took photographs necessary for the investigation.

A total of 183 people were killed in the crash: 8 crew members and 175 passengers. Survivors totaled 79: 32 people (4 crew members and 28 passengers) received non-fatal injuries, while 47 people (1 crew member and 46 passengers) were uninjured.

See also
List of accidents and incidents involving commercial aircraft
Martinair Flight 138
Turkish Airlines Flight 6491

References

External links 
Civil Aviation Authority of Sri Lanka
Final report (Archive) (Non-PDF version with appendices)

Icelandic
Airliner accidents and incidents caused by pilot error
Aviation accidents and incidents caused by air traffic controller error
Aviation accidents and incidents in Sri Lanka
Accidents and incidents involving the Douglas DC-8
001
1978 in Sri Lanka
November 1978 events in Europe
1978 disasters in Sri Lanka
November 1978 events in Asia